Unos Panas Ahi is an Argentinean-Venezuelan alternative rock band. Formed in Caracas in 2000, the group comprise the Poggi brothers, Luis Poggi (Vocals and Guitar) and Alfredo Poggi (Vocals and bass) and  Eduard Perez (Percussion), Jose Araque, (Drums), Marcos Tinedo (keyboards) and Daniel Crespo (Drums).

History
Unos Panas Ahi first song released in 2001, “El Mamut Chiquitito” (The Little Mammoth) hit the top 5 in several Latin American countries and Spain. After the success of “The Little Mammoth”,  Unos Panas Ahi released other singles, such as: “Yo no quiero” (I don't want), “Macho que se respeta” (Macho who is respected) and “Yo hago lo que quiero” (I do what I want) that achieved the top 10 in Venezuela.

Unos Panas Ahi have played in several underground concerts in Venezuela and in major concerts such as the "Festival Music for the Earth" a Latin American concert that is played at the same time across several countries.

Unos Panas Ahi won awards in Venezuela such as: the Alma Mater New bands 2001, Urbe best song of the year 2002, Unimet (Universidad Metropolitana) new bands 2002, UCAB (Universidad Catolica Andres Bello) music contest 2002.

In March 2010, The Poggi's & Unos Panas Ahi recorded the English version of the song "The Little Mammoth" with a similar version of the original video on YouTube. The song was released in the online stores on April 20, 2010.

Repertoire

 "El Mamut Chiquitito" or "The Little Mammoth", the first release of the band. The song achieved the top 5 in several Latin American countries and Spain. The little mammoth humorly advises the consequences of vices.
 "Yo hago lo que quiero" (I do what I want). Achieved top 10 in Venezuela, the song was used by Venezuelan students in their protest campaigns against president.
 "Macho que se respeta" (Macho who is respected)
 "Yo no quiero" (I don't want)

References

External links
 Myspace 
 Rock de Venezuela 
Letrasymas

Argentine alternative rock groups